Berg Upper Secondary School (Norwegian: Berg videregående skole)  was an upper secondary school located in Oslo, Norway. The school was established in 1925 and provided education leading to the International Baccalaureate (IB) Diploma as well as the college preparatory "studiespesialisering" of the Norwegian school system. The school was closed in 2014, and most programs and employees moved to the new Blindern Upper Secondary School. The buildings are now the location of Berg skole. 

In its final years, the school had around 465 students - 108 graduating in the Norwegian system and 55 graduating with IB Diplomas each year. About 70 faculty members worked at the school.

It was the first Norwegian educational institution to offer the IB Diploma (in 1978) and was a leading institution in several educational reforms. The school was ranked among the best performing schools in the International Baccalaureate system.

Berg had several winners of the national science competitions. Among these are Magnus Deli Vigeland and Nina Holden, who both have won the Abel Competition.

Notable alumni 

 Arvid Storsveen (1915–1943), engineer and founder of the WWII resistance/intelligence organisation XU
 Erik Diesen (1922–1999), journalist and television pioneer
 Nils Christie (1928–2015), sociologist and criminologist
 Helge Reiss (1928–2009), actor
 Ole Peter Kolby (born 1939), diplomat and former president of the UN Security Council
 Jon Skolmen (born 1940), actor and comedian
 Finn Wagle (born 1941), former primate in the Church of Norway and bishop in Nidaros (Trondheim)
 Else Bugge Fougner (born 1944), lawyer and former minister of justice
 Trond Kirkvaag (1946–2007), comedian
 Ivar Formo (1951–2006), Olympic gold medalist
 Lars Saabye Christensen (born 1953), novelist, recipient of the Nordic Council Prize for Literature
 Per Christian Ellefsen (born 1954), actor
 Per Boye Hansen (born 1957), Director of Bergen International Festival
 Siri Bjerke (born 1958), Divisional Director in Innovation Norway, former Minister of Environment
 Torstein Bieler (born 1959), musician
 Vigdis Hjorth (born 1959), novelist
 Lars Fredrik Beckstrøm (born 1960), musician (deLillos)
 Gabriel R. G. Benito (born 1960), Dean and Professor BI Norwegian Business School
 Rune Bjerke (born 1960), President and CEO of DnB NOR
 Ida Hjort Kraby (born 1960), lawyer
 Vetle Lid Larssen (born 1960), novelist
 Jonas Gahr Støre (born 1960), Norwegian Minister of Foreign Affairs, former Secretary General of the Norwegian Red Cross and Executive Director in the World Health Organization (WHO)
 Inger Marie Sunde (born 1961), former Chief Public Prosecutor (førstestatsadvokat), prosecutor in the case against "DVD-Jon"
 Hege Duckert (born 1962), journalist and editor of Dagbladet
 Henrik Mestad (born 1964), actor
 Helene Uri (born 1964), novelist
 Fredrik Skavlan (born 1966), journalist, illustrator and television personality
 Simen Agdestein (born 1967), International chess grandmaster and National Team player in soccer
 Bård Folke Fredriksen (born 1967), head of the Conservative Party in Oslo City Council
 Henrik H. Langeland (born 1972), novelist
 Håvard Homstvedt (born 1976), New York based painter
 Nikolai Astrup (born 1978), Member of the Norwegian Parliament, vice chairman of Oslo Conservative Party and former editor of the Minerva political magazine
 Elisabeth O. Sjaastad (born 1978), film director
 Petrit Selimi (born 1979), Foreign Minister of Kosovo
Simen Hegstad Krüger (born 1993), Olympic gold medalist, cross country skiing

The International Baccalaureate Diploma 
IB at Berg requires a student to study languages, social sciences, natural sciences and mathematics over two years. It is based on the first year of Norwegian videregående skole, or similar academic preparation. The IB Diploma course which is taught in English, is designed to cater for internationally mobile student applicants and Norwegian students interested in a secondary school education offering notably a somewhat greater in-depth study in three of the university preparatory subjects, taught in English.

Berg was authorized to teach the IB Diploma in 1978.

External links 
Berg's web site

Secondary schools in Norway
International Baccalaureate schools in Norway
Schools in Oslo
Oslo Municipality
Educational institutions established in 1925
1925 establishments in Norway
Educational institutions disestablished in 2014
2014 disestablishments in Norway